Jack Cole (born 3 July 2003) is a professional rugby league footballer who plays as a  or  for the Penrith Panthers in the NRL.

Playing career
In round 25 of the 2022 NRL season, Cole made his debut for the Penrith side against the North Queensland Cowboys.
Cole spent the majority of the season playing for Penrith's NSW Cup team.  Cole played for Penrith in their 2022 NSW Cup Grand Final victory scoring a try during the first half.
On 2 October, Cole played in Penrith's 44-10 victory over Norths Devils in the NRL State Championship final.

References

External links
Penrith Panthers profile

Australian rugby league players
Rugby league five-eighths
Penrith Panthers players
Living people
2003 births